Cardiff South and Penarth is a constituency of the Senedd. It elects one Member of the Senedd by the first past the post electoral system. It is typically a safe Labour seat.

Constituency profile and voting

The constituency was created for the first election to the Assembly, in 1999, with the name and boundaries of the Cardiff South and Penarth Westminster constituency. It is entirely within the preserved county of South Glamorgan. The only major boundary changes that have occurred in recent years is the inclusion of the ward of Sully into the constituency for the 2007 National Assembly for Wales election.

Cardiff South and Penarth is part of the South Wales Central electoral region. As one of the eight constituencies in South Wales Central, it, along with the other constituencies in the region, elect four additional members. The other seven constituencies of the region are Cardiff Central, Cardiff North, Cardiff West, Cynon Valley, Pontypridd, Rhondda and Vale of Glamorgan.

The use of the Additional Member System means that each voter has two votes. The first vote is for a candidate to become the Member of the Senedd for the voter's constituency, elected under the first past the post system. The second vote is used to vote for a regional closed party list of candidates. Additional member's seats are allocated from the lists by the d'Hondt method, to create a more proportional outcome in both the region and the Senedd.

Assembly members and Members of the Senedd

Elections

Elections in the 2020s

Elections in the 2010s

Regional ballots rejected at the count: 176

Elections in the 2000s

2003 Electorate: 65,505
Regional ballots rejected: 423

Elections in the 1990s

1999 Electorate: 60,996

References

Politics of Cardiff
Senedd constituencies in the South Wales Central electoral region
1999 establishments in Wales
Constituencies established in 1999